Ghandy is an Indian surname. Notable people with the surname include:

 Anuradha Ghandy (1954–2008), Indian communist, writer, and revolutionary leader
 Jeahangir Ghandy, Indian businessperson
 Kekoo Gandhy (1920–2012), Indian art gallery owner, founded Gallery Chemould in Mumbai, 1963 
 Kobad Ghandy (born 1951), Indian communist and Maoist leader
 Feroze Jehangir Ghandy, also known as Feroze Gandhi (1912-1960), Indian politician and journalist.

See also
 Gandhi (surname)
 Gandy (surname)

Parsi people